B. Ranganathan is an Indian politician and has been a Member of the Legislative Assembly of Tamil Nadu. He was elected to the Tamil Nadu legislative assembly from Purasawalkam constituency as an Indian National Congress candidate in the 1991 and 1996 elections. He was elected  as a Dravida Munnetra Kazhagam candidate in 2001 election. In 2006 election he was elected as M.L.A. for Villivakkam constituency.
He was re-elected to  Villivakkam constituency in 2016. He was a staunch opponent of AIADMK and their policies. He is very active in Kolathur ex-Purasai area and lives in Jawahar Nagar near Perambur. B. Ranganathan has a reputation for field work and his fights with the opponents in and outside the assembly. He was once a confidant of P. Chidambaram when in Congress but moved to DMK after Mr Chidambaram merged his Peravai with Congress.

References 

Living people
Tamil Nadu MLAs 1991–1996
Tamil Nadu MLAs 1996–2001
Tamil Nadu MLAs 2001–2006
Tamil Nadu MLAs 2006–2011
Tamil Nadu MLAs 2016–2021
Dravida Munnetra Kazhagam politicians
Year of birth missing (living people)